Anton Vladimirovich Arsenyev (born 22 March 1985) is a former Russian professional football player.

Club career
He played 3 seasons in the Russian Football National League for FC Petrotrest Saint Petersburg and FC Dynamo Saint Petersburg.

External links
 
 

1985 births
Living people
Russian footballers
Association football goalkeepers
FC Zenit-2 Saint Petersburg players
FC Dynamo Vologda players
FC Petrotrest players
FC Dynamo Saint Petersburg players